Belgium was represented by Louis Neefs, with the song "Ik heb zorgen", at the 1967 Eurovision Song Contest, which took place on 8 April in Vienna. "Ik heb zorgen" was chosen at the Belgian national final on 25 February. Neefs would represent Belgium again in 1969.

Before Eurovision

National final 
Qualification for the national final was via a series of nine heats which took the form of elimination rounds, with the eight songs left standing to go forward to the final.

The final took place on 25 February 1967 at the Amerikaans Theater in Brussels, hosted by Jan Theys. In the event only seven songs took part, as Neefs had qualified two songs but decided to jettison "Zij was zo mooi" in order not to run the risk of splitting his vote (although given the ultimate margin of victory of "Ik heb zorgen", this would have been academic). 

Voting was by an "expert" jury and only three of the songs registered any points on the board.

At Eurovision 
On the night of the final Neefs performed 10th in the running order, following Germany and preceding eventual contest winners the United Kingdom. At the close of the voting "Ik heb zorgen" had received 8 points (the highest being 3 from Finland), placing Belgium 7th of the 17 participating countries. The highest marks from the Belgian jury were 3s to Ireland and the United Kingdom.

Voting

References 

1967
Countries in the Eurovision Song Contest 1967
Eurovision